OMLE is a four-letter acronym that can be used to signify:

 Organisation of Marxists-Leninists of Greece
 Organisation of Marxist-Leninists of Spain